Vetle Winger Dragsnes (born 6 February 1994) is a Norwegian footballer who plays for Lillestrøm.

Career statistics

Club

References

1994 births
Living people
Norwegian footballers
Eliteserien players
Strømmen IF players
Ullensaker/Kisa IL players
Mjøndalen IF players
Association football midfielders
Norwegian First Division players
People from Rælingen